David Bunderla (born 31 July 1987) is a Slovenian football forward who plays for Zarica Kranj.

Bunderla played for Primorje, Maribor, Koper and Triglav Kranj in the Slovenian PrvaLiga.

Honours
Maribor
Slovenian PrvaLiga: 2008–09
Slovenian Cup: 2009–10
Slovenian Supercup: 2009

References

External links
Player profile at NZS 
Player profile at ÖFB 

1987 births
Living people
Sportspeople from Kranj
Slovenian footballers
Association football forwards
NK Primorje players
NK Maribor players
FC Koper players
NK Triglav Kranj players
Slovenian expatriate footballers
Slovenian expatriate sportspeople in Austria
Expatriate footballers in Austria
Slovenian PrvaLiga players
Slovenian Second League players
Slovenia youth international footballers
Slovenia under-21 international footballers